The history of the Jews in Prague (capital of today's Czech Republic) is one of Central Europe's oldest and most well-known. Prague boasts one of Europe's oldest recorded Jewish communities (Hebrew: "Kehilla"), first mentioned by a Mizrahi-Jewish traveller Ibrahim ibn Yaqub in 965. Since then, the community never ceased to exist, despite a number of pogroms and expulsions, the Holocaust, and subsequent antisemitic persecution by the Communist regime in the 20th century. Nowadays, the Jewish community of Prague numbers approximately 2,000 members. There are a number of synagogues of all Jewish denominations, a Chabad centre, an old age home, a kindergarten, Lauder Schools, Judaic Studies department at the Charles University, kosher restaurants and even a kosher hotel. Famous Jews from Prague include the Maharal, Franz Kafka, Miloš Forman and Madeleine Albright.

Prague Renaissance

Basic overview

The 16th century began the Jewish Renaissance in Prague. Prague nobility in 1501 allowed for an open atmosphere of economic activity. Yet during the Habsburg reign, the Jewish people were expelled twice in 1542 and 1561. Each time they returned to prosper even more. From 1564 to 1612, the reigns of Maximilian II and Rudolf II were “golden ages” for the Jews in Prague. In the early 18th century, the Jews accounted for about a quarter of Prague's population. More Jewish people lived in Prague than anywhere else in the world. This “golden age” ended with Empress Maria Theresa's succession to the throne, who expelled the Jews once again. Unfortunately Prague's Jewish Quarter was totally demolished in the early 1900s, except for the synagogues and a few other buildings, and rebuilt in the fashion of the time, art nouveau style. 
 
Prague had a Jewish population of 10,338 in 1946, of whom 1,396 Jews had not been deported (mostly of mixed Jewish and Christian parentage); 227 Jews had gone underground; 4,986 returned from prisons, concentration camps or the Theresienstadt Ghetto; 883 returned from Czechoslovak army units abroad; 613 were Czechoslovak Jewish emigres who returned; and 2,233 were Jews from Ruthenia (Carpatho-Ukraine), which had been ceded to the U.S.S.R. who decided to move to Czechoslovakia.

The Jewish Quarter and ghetto

There was no legal transition from the Jewish Quarter to the ghetto. It was unstated but understood. Known as Židovské město in Czech (and later Judenstadt in German), the ghetto was the center of Jewish mysticism. From 1522 to 1541, the population of the ghetto almost doubled due to influx of Jews expelled from Moravia, German lands (of the Holy Roman Empire), Austria and Spain. The ghetto grew in area because laws allow the Jews to build homes on land next to the ghetto. Inside the ghetto, the Jewish people had their own town hall with a prized small bell used to call attendees to meetings. The Jews even had permission to fly their own flag. Jewish living in the ghetto prospered in many diverse professions such as mathematicians, astronomers, geographers, historians, philosophers, and artists.

Old Jewish cemetery
The Old Jewish Cemetery, one of the oldest Jewish cemeteries in Europe, (the oldest is in Worms from the 11th century) opened in 1439 and closed in 1787. The cemetery is located on a small plot of land between the Pinkas Synagogue and the Klausen Synagogue. During the four hundred plus years that the cemetery was active, about 200,000 Jewish people from the ghetto were buried there. Because the cemetery was only capable of holding around ten percent of the number of Jews buried there, the graves spanned about twelve tombs deep. The most famous tomb belongs to Rabbi Loew, who was born in 1525 and died in 1609. Loew is thought to be the creator of the Golem, an artificial man made out of clay. The “Golem” was brought to life by placing a tablet with Hebrew inscription in its mouth. The oldest grave in the cemetery belongs to Rabbi Avigdor Kara. Surprisingly, this cemetery would probably not be intact today, if not for actions taken by the Nazis. Other Jewish cemeteries conquered by the Nazis were destroyed and the gravestones were used during target practice, but Hitler ordered that this cemetery be saved to serve as part of a museum after all the Jews had been extinguished.

The synagogues

The oldest Jewish house of worship in Prague, the "Old School," is no longer standing, but it is responsible for the original name of the "Great" or "New School", when it was built in 1270. After more synagogues were built later on, this medieval gothic building became known as the Old New Synagogue or Altneuschul.

During the Renaissance in Prague, four major Jewish synagogues were built and completed. The Pinkas Synagogue served the people of Prague, beginning in 1479. It showcased Renaissance design, throughout its architecture. Franz Kafka, a famous twentieth century author, attended services there. The synagogue resided in a flood zone, which caused a myriad of damage. In 1591, Emperor Rudolph II allowed the building of the Maisel Synagogue, named for the benefactor Mordechai Maisel, who donated the money for the temple's building. This synagogue suffered through multiple fires. Another Synagogue, located on other land donated by Maisel, was the Klausen Synagogue. Built with Baroque style, the temple opened in 1694. Finally, the High Synagogue stood and still stands next to the Jewish Town Hall. Since the actual synagogue/ sanctuary is on the second floor the people dubbed it the High Synagogue. This synagogue served the seniors of the ghetto.

During the 1945 bombing of Prague, the Vinohrady synagogue (opened 1896), the largest Jewish house of prayer in the city, was destroyed. 

Two more landmark synagogues still stand in Prague: the Spanish Synagogue, built in 1868 on the site of the "Old School," and the Jerusalem Synagogue, dedicated in 1906. The former was built in the Moorish style, while the design of the latter combines Moorish elements with Art Nouveau.

More synagogues were built in the suburbs of Prague: in Michle (opened ca 1730), Uhřiněves (1848), Košíře (1849), Libeň (1858), Karlín (1861), Smíchov (consecrated 1863, reconstructed 1931) and Bubny (1899). These synagogues, however, no longer serve its original purpose.

Flags of the Jews of Prague

Charles IV gave the Jews of Prague the honour of a flag in 1357. The red flag includes a yellow Magen David (Star of David), often considered to be the first use of a Magen David to represent a Jewish community.

In 1648, Ferdinand III gave the community a flag for helping fight off Swedish attackers during the Thirty Years' War.

A simple flag of a yellow Magen David on a red field is now used to represent the Jewish community and the old Jewish quarter now known as Josefov.

See also 
 2006 Prague terror plot
 Jewish Museum in Prague
 Judeo-Czech language

References

External links
The Jewish History of Prague by Rabbi Menachem Levine on Aish.com
Chanukah celebration in prague, by Jewish community of prague
Jewish Stories of Prague, Jewish Prague in History and Legend
The Jewish Community of Prague`s website

Further reading

Nina Balatka by Anthony Trollope

 
Jewish
Jewish
Prague
Prague